Another Perfect Day is the sixth studio album by British rock band Motörhead. It was released in May 1983 by Bronze Records, which would be the band's last full-length original album with the label. It is the band's only studio album to feature lead guitarist Brian "Robbo" Robertson, best known for his work with Thin Lizzy.

Recording
After lead guitarist "Fast" Eddie Clarke left Motörhead in 1982 in the midst of the band's Iron Fist US tour, guitarist Brian "Robbo" Robertson (ex-Thin Lizzy, Wild Horses) was recruited to complete the tour. Drummer Phil "Philthy Animal" Taylor, who had been a huge Thin Lizzy fan, had lobbied vocalist/bassist/band leader Lemmy to hire Robertson. The change was initially welcomed by both Lemmy and Taylor; in Joel McIver's book Overkill: The Untold Story of Motörhead, Lemmy is quoted at the time saying that the band's sound had:

These feelings would change dramatically once they entered the studio with producer Tony Platt; Lemmy would recall years later in the Motörhead documentary The Guts and the Glory: 

The original vinyl release featured a lyric-sheet insert, with a cartoon storyboard of the adventures of the new band, as it were. The cassette and US LP versions had a vastly different track list, with "I Got Mine" opening the album and "Back at the Funny Farm" opening side two. The band supported the album with the Another Perfect Tour tour, and almost immediately audiences and industry personnel alike took notice of the jarring contrast between Lemmy and Taylor, clad in their usual leathers, and Robertson, who took to wearing satin shorts and slip-on espadrille shoes onstage, which were becoming quite fashionable in the mid-1980s. In his 2002 autobiography White Line Fever, Lemmy writes: Lemmy began to make light of Robertson's attire during shows, but he explained to Classic Rock interviewer David Ling:
 
In his memoir, Lemmy put the album into perspective:

Following the album and tour, Robertson and Taylor left Motörhead to form the band Operator, leaving only Lemmy to continue on with Motörhead. Since then, "Shine", "Die You Bastard!", "Dancing on Your Grave", "I Got Mine", "Another Perfect Day", "One Track Mind", and "Rock It" have been featured in the band's live set. In 2013, Lemmy told Lee Marlow of Classic Rock that he hadn't spoken to Robertson since 1983 and maintained:

Sleeve artwork
Joe Petagno, the sleeve artist, commented that the cover was inspired by the upheaval prevalent in the band and its members at the time:

In 1988 Castle Communications re-issued this album along with Overkill in a gatefold sleeve.

Critical reception

John Franck of AllMusic calls Another Perfect Day "one of the most unique (albeit misunderstood) albums in the entire Motörhead catalog", adding that it is one of "the band's best-sounding records ever, but tinkering with a legendary formula is always fraught with danger (is that a boogie-woogie piano on 'Rock It'?), and as one might expect, the results here are alternately exhilarating and sometimes frustrating". Motörhead biographer Joel McIver wrote in 2011 that it was "worth revisiting for those who may have forgotten its genuine charms". Thrash metal band Sepultura named themselves after the third track from this album, "Dancing on Your Grave" ("sepultura" is "grave" in Portuguese). The songs "Back at the Funny Farm" and "Marching Off to War" were featured on the video game Brütal Legend.

Track listing

Sanctuary Records 2006 2-CD deluxe edition
Disc one is the original album minus the bonus tracks, except the B-side of the "I Got Mine" single. 
Disc two is a live recording at the Manchester Apollo, 10 June 1983.

Personnel
Per the album's liner notes.
 Lemmy – bass, vocals
 Brian "Robbo" Robertson – guitars, piano on "Rock It", Fender piano on "Shine" and backing vocals on "Back at the Funny Farm"
 Phil "Philthy Animal" Taylor – drums

Production
Tony Platt – producer, mixing
Andy Pearce – mastering (2006 remaster)
Joe Petagno – Snaggletooth
Curt Evans – 2006 cover design

2006 deluxe edition remaster
 Steve Hammonds – release coordination
 Jon Richards – release coordination
Malcolm Dome – sleeve notes
Mick Stevenson – project consultant, photos, and archive memorabilia

Charts

References

External links
 Motörhead official website

Motörhead albums
1983 albums
Mercury Records albums
Albums with cover art by Joe Petagno
Bronze Records albums
Albums produced by Tony Platt
Speed metal albums
Albums recorded at Olympic Sound Studios